Chemical Waste Management, Inc. v. Hunt, 504 U.S. 334 (1992), was a United States Supreme Court case that held that an Alabama law imposing a fee (of $72 per ton) on out-of-state hazardous waste being disposed of in-state violated the Dormant Commerce Clause.

Opinion of the Court
The state law was found to discriminate against out-of-state commerce. Justice White explained that "No state may attempt to isolate itself from a problem common to the several States by raising barriers to the free flow of interstate trade," relying on Philadelphia v. New Jersey (1978) as precedent.

The Court suggested two less-discriminatory alternatives to the fee on out-of-state hazardous waste:

 A generally-applicable, additional fee per ton of all hazardous waste disposed of within Alabama, regardless of its source.
 A per-mile tax on all vehicles transporting hazardous waste across Alabama roads.

Dissent
Chief Justice Rehnquist dissented arguing that States may wish to avoid the risks to public health and environment by regulating the disposal of hazardous waste. He continued to say that since taxes are a recognized and effective means for discouraging the consumption of scarce commodities, which he in this case had deemed the environment. Then there was nothing unconstitutional or discriminatory about the state of Alabama's taxes.

Related cases
 White v. Massachusetts Council of Constr. Employers, Inc., 460 U.S. 204, 206 -208 (1983)
 Reeves, Inc. v. Stake, 447 U.S. 429, 436-437 (1980)
 Hughes v. Alexandria Scrap Corp., 426 U.S. 794, 810 (1976)

See also
 Emelle, Alabama
 Environmental dumping
 List of United States Supreme Court cases, volume 504
 List of United States Supreme Court cases
 Lists of United States Supreme Court cases by volume
 List of United States Supreme Court cases by the Rehnquist Court

References

Further reading

External links
 

United States Supreme Court cases
United States Supreme Court cases of the Rehnquist Court
1992 in the environment
1992 in United States case law
United States environmental case law